Until the late 2000s, terrorism in Sweden was not seen as a serious threat to the security of the state. However, there has been a rise in far right and Islamist terrorist activity in the 21st century.

The Swedish government agency tasked with keeping watch over terrorism-related threats is the Swedish Security Service.

1970s to 1990s

The terrorism-related event in modern Swedish history which received the most attention was the West German embassy siege in 1975, which was carried out by the Red Army Faction. In 1976, the same group also planned Operation Leo which was to involve the kidnapping of Anna-Greta Leijon, but which was never set in action.

In 1986 Swedish Prime Minister Olof Palme was killed in an action of dubious motivations. Several different terrorist leads were considered, but none has been proved conclusive, and the police main lead was a lone madman.

At the end of the 1980s a neo-Nazi movement developed in Sweden. National Youth activist Klas Lund was convicted of bank robbery and of the murder of Ronny Landin in the summer of 1986. National Youth was linked to the Swedish Resistance Movement. In 1988, the Nordic National Party formed a new network named VAM (The White Aryan Resistance), in which Lund was also involved; it became well known for a series of burglaries and robberies including one where they broke into a Lidingö police station and stole 36 guns. At the same time far right activist John Ausonius engaged in a shooting spree targeting immigrants. He was not involved in the neo-Nazi movement, but the concurrence of the events garnered press exposure. VAM no longer exists as a movement, but there are numerous organizations rooted in it, including the Swedish Resistance Movement (SMR) led by Klas Lund and the Party of the Swedes (SVP). In 1998, far right activist Hampus Hellekant murdered syndicalist union member Björn Söderberg after Söderberg campaigned against the Nazi activities of Info-14's Robert Vesterlund. Info-14 claimed one police killing in Malexander (the perpetrators, including Jackie Arklöv had links to the National Socialist Front too) and a car bomb in Nacka in 1999, leading the paper's editor, Vesterlund, to be sentenced to eighteen months in prison for incitement to racial hatred, threats against an officer, and aggravated incitement.

Sweden-based Palestinian terrorists Abu Talb and Marten Imandi were convicted of perpetrating a series of bombings and  attacks in 1985 and 1986, along with two co-conspirators who received lesser sentences.  The attacks included the 1985 Copenhagen bombings of the Great Synagogue and Northwest Orient Airlines, and the bombing of Pan Am Flight 103, the "Lockerbie bombing."

21st century

In the 2000s, the issue of terrorism financing and recruiting for terrorist groups, including Islamist groups, have also been on the security agenda. Criminal acts from domestic political extremist groups, both on the right and on the left, have also become an increasing phenomenon.

The Neo-nazi activist group Swedish Resistance Movement (SRM) was formed in 1997 and merged into the Nordic Resistance Movement (NRM) in 2016. The group has been behind several violent actions since a bomb and the murder of the journalist Björn Söderberg in 1999. In 2017, NRM members were arrested for involvement in two bombings and a bombing attempt in Gothenburg, near two refugee accommodations and a syndicalist organization. Legion Wasa is a neo-Nazi paramilitary organisation founded in 1999, whose members have reportedly been preparing for race war, and once made preparations for helping out Saddam Hussein in the Iraq War against the invading United States Army. Led by Curt Linusson, a former UN soldier and Home Guard officer, the group has conducted field practice in the forests of Västergötland. The organisation is said to have between 25 and 30 members. In 2004 four members of the organisation were arrested, charged with plotting mass murders of political opponents, and of forming a terrorist cell inspired by the novel The Turner Diaries. All four were acquitted for terror charges, although three of the charged were convicted for violence and drug charges, with sentences ranging from one to two years imprisonment. The 2010s saw an upsurge in far right violence in Sweden.

Islamic terrorism 

According to the Swedish Defence University, since the 1970s, a number of residents of Sweden have been implicated in providing logistical and financial support to or joining various foreign-based transnational Islamic militant groups. Among these organizations are Hezbollah, Hamas, the GIA, Al-Qaeda, the Islamic State, Al-Shabaab, Ansar al-Sunna and Ansar al-Islam.

In the 2000s, Islamists in Sweden were not primarily seeking to commit attacks in Sweden, but were rather using Sweden as a base of operations against other countries and for providing logistical support for groups abroad.

In 2010, the Swedish Security Service estimated that a total of 200 individuals were involved in the Swedish Islamist extremist environment. According to the Swedish Defence University, most of these militants were affiliated with the Islamic State, with around 300 people traveling to Syria and Iraq to join the group and Al-Qaeda associated outfits like Jabhat al-nusra in the 2012-2017 period and some have financed their activities with funds from the Swedish state welfare systems. In 2017, Swedish Security Service director Anders Thornberg stated that the number of violent Islamic extremists residing in Sweden to number was estimated to be "thousands". The Danish Security and Intelligence Service judged the number of jihadists in Sweden to be a threat against Denmark since two terrorists arriving from Sweden had already been sentenced in the 2010 Copenhagen terror plot. Security expert Magnus Ranstorp has argued that efforts to improve anti-terror legislation has been hampered by human rights activists such as Ywonne Ruwaida, Mehmet Kaplan and the organisation Charta 2008. A change in the activism occurred in the 2013-2014 time frame due to the number of Swedish citizens travelling to join the Islamic State. He also stated that some of the loudest activists have withdrawn from public debate after being exposed for harassing women in the metoo campaign.



See also
 2014 mosque arson attacks in Sweden
 2017 Gothenburg Synagogue attack
 Malmö mosque arson attack
 Malmö synagogue arson attack
 Oussama Kassir
 Mehdi Ghezali
 Mohamed Moumou
 Terrorism in the European Union
 Antisemitism in Sweden
 United States-Sweden relations
 Israel-Sweden relations
 Iraq-Sweden relations

References

 
Sweden
Human rights abuses in Sweden